The 2019 National Dreamtime Awards event was the 2019 iteration of the National Dreamtime Awards, held on Saturday 16 November 2019 at The Star, Sydney and hosted by Andy Saunders and Rachael Hocking. The Awards program was broadcast nationally on NITV.

2019 Dreamtime Award recipients
The following individuals and organisations were awarded prizes in their various categories:

 Dreamtime Person of the Year – Ashleigh Barty
 Dreamtime Lifetime Achievement – Nova Peris
 Dreamtime Elder – Uncle Ralph Naden
 Male Music Artist – Electric Fields
 Female Music Artist – Jessica Mauboy
 Male Actor – Rob Collins
 Female Actor – Rarriwuy Hick
 Media Person of the Year – Brooke Boney
 Male Sportsperson – Jack Wighton
 Female Sportsperson – Ashleigh Barty

 Best New Sports Talent – Brent Naden
 Community Person – Thomas Cameron
 Business of the Year – Walkabout Barber
 Community Organisation – The Purple House
 Educator of the Year – Amanda Toomey
 Educational Institute of the Year – Koorie Education, Deakin University
 Student of the Year – Matthew Watts

References

2019
Indigenous Australia-related lists
2019 in Australian music